Joseph Daniel Doerksen (born October 9, 1977) is a Canadian retired mixed martial artist. A professional from 1999 until 2014, he fought in the UFC, WEC, IFL, King of the Cage, Aggression Fighting Championship, World Victory Road, RINGS, SuperBrawl and DEEP.

Mixed martial arts career

Early career
Doerksen started his career in 1999, when he entered the first Bas Rutten Invitational on February 6, 1999, defeating three different opponents by submission before losing to UFC vet Eugene Jackson by submission.

His next notable fight was against now-UFC Hall of Famer Matt Hughes at Extreme Challenge 29 on November 13, 1999, losing by second round submission (punches).

Ultimate Fighting Championship
In his first fight in the UFC, Doerksen faced Joe Riggs at UFC 49 on August 21, 2004. He lost the fight via second round submission.

He then faced Patrick Cote at UFC 52 on April 16, 2005. Doerksen won the fight via rear-naked choke submission.

In his third fight with the promotion, Doerksen faced Matt Lindland at UFC 54 on August 20, 2005. He lost the fight via unanimous decision.

Doerksen faced Nate Marquardt at UFC 58 on March 4, 2006. He lost the fight via unanimous decision and was subsequently released from the promotion.

In November 2006, it was reported that Doerksen had signed a contract with the PRIDE Fighting Championships,  but with Zuffa's purchase of the PRIDE organization in the spring of 2007, Doerksen's contract saw him enter the WEC organization instead.

World Extreme Cagefighting
His first fight in the organization was against PRIDE veteran Paulo Filho for the vacant WEC middleweight championship at WEC 29 on August 5, 2007. Doerksen lost the fight via TKO in the first round.

Return to the UFC
Following his loss to Filho, Doerksen returned to the UFC and faced Ed Herman at UFC 78 on November 17, 2007. He lost the fight via third-round KO.

In his next fight, Doerksen faced Jason MacDonald at UFC 83 on April 19, 2008. He lost the fight via TKO (elbows) and was once again released from the promotion.

Post-UFC
After his UFC release, Doerksen signed with World Victory Road promotion in October 2008, and would make his debut against Izuru Takeuchi at Sengoku 6 on November 1, 2008. He won the fight via TKO.

Doerksen defeated Gregory Babene via triangle-choke submission at Canadian Fighting Championship 2 on May 22, 2009.
 
He then returned to WVR and faced Takenori Sato at Sengoku 10 on September 23, 2009. Doerksen won the fight via KO.

Third UFC stint
Riding a five-fight win streak, Doerksen returned to the UFC to face Tom Lawlor on May 8, 2010 at UFC 113, replacing an injured Tim Credeur.  Following a first round in which he was rocked by Lawlor, Doerksen rebounded and won via submission (rear-naked choke) in the second round.

Doerksen next faced CB Dollaway on September 25, 2010 at UFC 119. He lost the fight via guillotine choke in the first round.

Doerksen then faced Dan Miller on December 11, 2010 at UFC 124. He lost the fight via split decision and was subsequently released from the promotion.

Retirement
Doerksen announced his retirement from MMA competition on August 21, 2015.

Documentary
Doerksen was the subject of a 2013 documentary by filmmaker BJ Verot called Scheduled Violence.

Championships and accomplishments
Icon Sport
SuperBrawl 30 Middleweight Tournament Winner

Mixed martial arts record

|-
| Win
| align=center| 51–16
| Tony Lopez
| Decision (unanimous)
| King of the Cage: Madness 
| 
| align=center| 3
| align=center| 5:00
| Winnipeg, Manitoba, Canada
| Light Heavyweight bout.
|-
| Win
| align=center| 50–16
| Mike Kent
| Submission (armbar)
| Canadian Fighting Championship 8
| 
| align=center| 1
| align=center| 2:29
| Winnipeg, Manitoba, Canada
| 
|-
| Win
| align=center| 49–16
| Kalib Starnes
| Decision (unanimous)
| AFC 11: Takeover
| 
| align=center| 3
| align=center| 5:00
| Winnipeg, Manitoba, Canada
| 
|-
| Win
| align=center| 48–16
| Joel Powell
| Submission (guillotine choke)
| AFC 10: Rise
| 
| align=center| 2 
| align=center| 3:25
| Calgary, Alberta, Canada
| 
|-
| Loss
| align=center| 47–16
| Brett Cooper
| TKO (punches)
| SFS 2: Doerksen vs. Cooper
| 
| align=center| 1
| align=center| 3:55
| Hamilton, Ontario, Canada
| 
|-
| Win 
| align=center| 47–15
| Luigi Fioravanti
| Decision (unanimous)
| Score Fighting Series
| 
| align=center| 3
| align=center| 5:00
| Mississauga, Ontario, Canada
| 
|-
| Loss
| align=center| 46–15
| Hector Lombard
| TKO (doctor stoppage)
| Cage Fighting Championship 16
| 
| align=center| 1
| align=center| 4:13
| Sydney, Australia
| 
|-
| Loss
| align=center| 46–14
| Dan Miller
| Decision (split)
| UFC 124
| 
| align=center| 3
| align=center| 5:00
| Montreal, Quebec, Canada
| 
|-
| Loss
| align=center| 46–13
| CB Dollaway
| Submission (guillotine choke)
| UFC 119
| 
| align=center| 1
| align=center| 2:13
| Indianapolis, Indiana, United States
| 
|-
| Win
| align=center| 46–12
| Shawn Marchand
| TKO (punches)
| Canadian Fighting Championships 5
| 
| align=center| 1
| align=center| 0:43
| Winnipeg, Manitoba, Canada
| 
|-
| Win
| align=center| 45–12
| Tom Lawlor
| Submission (rear-naked choke)
| UFC 113
| 
| align=center| 2
| align=center| 2:10
| Montreal, Quebec, Canada
| 
|-
| Win
| align=center| 44–12
| Chad Herrick
| Decision (split)
| KOTC: Bad Boys II
| 
| align=center| 3
| align=center| 5:00
| Detroit, Michigan, United States
| 
|-
| Win
| align=center| 43–12
| Takenori Sato
| KO (punches)
| World Victory Road Presents: Sengoku 10
| 
| align=center| 2
| align=center| 4:29
| Saitama, Japan
| 
|-
| Win
| align=center| 42–12
| Gregory Babene
| Submission (triangle choke)
| Canadian Fighting Championships 2
| 
| align=center| 2
| align=center| 1:24
| Winnipeg, Manitoba, Canada
| 
|-
| Win
| align=center| 41–12
| Izuru Takeuchi
| TKO (punches)
| World Victory Road Presents: Sengoku 6
| 
| align=center| 3
| align=center| 4:13
| Saitama, Japan
| 
|-
| Win
| align=center| 40–12
| John Meyer
| Decision (split)
| Vipers MMA
| 
| align=center| 3
| align=center| 5:00
| Calgary, Alberta, Canada
| 
|-
| Loss
| align=center| 39–12
| Jason MacDonald
| TKO (elbows)
| UFC 83
| 
| align=center| 2
| align=center| 0:56
| Montreal, Quebec, Canada
| 
|-
| Loss
| align=center| 39–11
| Ed Herman
| KO (punch)
| UFC 78
| 
| align=center| 3
| align=center| 0:39
| Newark, New Jersey, United States
| 
|-
| Loss
| align=center| 39–10
| Paulo Filho
| TKO (punches)
| WEC 29
| 
| align=center| 1
| align=center| 4:07
| Las Vegas, Nevada, United States
| 
|-
| Win
| align=center| 39–9
| BJ Lacy
| TKO (punches)
| GFS: Colosseum 5
| 
| align=center| 2
| align=center| 1:11
| Winnipeg, Manitoba, Canada
| 
|-
| Win
| align=center| 38–9
| Dae Won Kim
| Submission (triangle choke)
| DEEP: 29 Impact
| 
| align=center| 1
| align=center| 3:35
| Tokyo, Japan
| 
|-
| Win
| align=center| 37–9
| Ryan McGivern
| Submission (rear-naked choke)
| IFL: World Championship Semifinals
| 
| align=center| 1
| align=center| 3:04
| Portland, Oregon, United States
| 
|-
| Win
| align=center| 36–9
| Brian Foster
| Submission (rear-naked choke)
| IFL: Gracie vs. Miletich
| 
| align=center| 2
| align=center| 3:40
| Moline, Illinois, United States
| 
|-
| Win
| align=center| 35–9
| Todd Carney
| Submission (rear-naked choke)
| Extreme Challenge 67
| 
| align=center| 1
| align=center| 2:39
| Moline, Illinois, United States
| 
|-
| Win
| align=center| 34–9
| Jeremy Johnson
| TKO (submission to punches)
| Combat in the Cage 2
| 
| align=center| 1
| align=center| 4:30
| Atlantic City, New Jersey, United States
| 
|-
| Win
| align=center| 33–9
| Thomas Russell
| Submission (rear-naked choke)
| GFS: Colosseum of Champions
| 
| align=center| 1
| align=center| 0:44
| Winnipeg, Manitoba, Canada
| 
|-
| Loss
| align=center| 32–9
| Nate Marquardt
| Decision (unanimous)
| UFC 58: USA vs. Canada
| 
| align=center| 3
| align=center| 5:00
| Las Vegas, Nevada, United States
| 
|-
| Loss
| align=center| 32–8
| Jason MacDonald
| Submission (rear-naked choke)
| UCW 3: Caged Inferno
| 
| align=center| 4
| align=center| 4:37
| Winnipeg, Manitoba, Canada
| 
|-
| Win
| align=center| 32–7
| Brendan Seguin
| TKO (leg kicks)
| King of the Cage: Firestorm
| 
| align=center| 3
| align=center| 1:49
| Calgary, Alberta, Canada
| 
|-
| Loss
| align=center| 31–7
| Matt Lindland
| Decision (unanimous)
| UFC 54
| 
| align=center| 3
| align=center| 5:00
| Las Vegas, Nevada, United States
| 
|-
| Win
| align=center| 31–6
| Art Santore
| Decision (unanimous)
| Freedom Fight: USA vs. Canada
| 
| align=center| 3
| align=center| 5:00
| Hull, Quebec, Canada
| 
|-
| Win
| align=center| 30–6
| Patrick Côté
| Submission (rear-naked choke)
| UFC 52
| 
| align=center| 3
| align=center| 2:35
| Las Vegas, Nevada, United States
| 
|-
| Win
| align=center| 29–6
| Matt Knaub
| Submission (triangle choke)
| International Fighting Championships: Eve Of Destruction
| 
| align=center| 1
| align=center| 1:08
| Salt Lake City, Utah, United States
|Light Heavyweight bout.
|-
| Win
| align=center| 28–6
| Ed Herman
| Technical submission (triangle choke)
| SF 7: Frightnight
| 
| align=center| 3
| align=center| 2:12
| Gresham, Oregon, United States
| 
|-
| Loss
| align=center| 27–6
| Joe Riggs
| TKO (submission to punches)
| UFC 49
| 
| align=center| 2
| align=center| 2:39
| Las Vegas, Nevada, United States
| 
|-
| Win
| align=center| 27–5
| Chris Leben
| Decision (unanimous)
| Freestyle Fighting Championships 9
| 
| align=center| 3
| align=center| 5:00
| Biloxi, Mississippi, United States
| 
|-
| Win
| align=center| 26–5
| Riki Fukuda
| Decision (unanimous)
| SuperBrawl 35
| 
| align=center| 3
| align=center| 5:00
| Honolulu, Hawaii, United States
|Light Heavyweight debut.
|-
| Win
| align=center| 25–5
| Danny Anderson
| Submission (armbar)
| Extreme Challenge 56
| 
| align=center| 1
| align=center| 3:40
| Medina, Minnesota, United States
| 
|-
| Win
| align=center| 24–5
| Brendan Seguin
| TKO (punches)
| SB 30: Collision Course
| 
| align=center| 1
| align=center| 2:14
| Honolulu, Hawaii, United States
| 
|-
| Win
| align=center| 23–5
| Jay Buck
| KO (kick)
| SB 30: Collision Course
| 
| align=center| 1
| align=center| 0:36
| Honolulu, Hawaii, United States
| 
|-
| Win
| align=center| 22–5
| Desi Miner
| Submission (rear-naked choke)
| SB 30: Collision Course
| 
| align=center| 1
| align=center| 2:20
| Honolulu, Hawaii, United States
| 
|-
| Win
| align=center| 21–5
| Kyle Jensen
| Submission (kimura)
| Extreme Combat
| 
| align=center| 1
| align=center| 4:40
| Minnesota, United States
| 
|-
| Win
| align=center| 20–5
| Anthony Macias
| TKO (punches)
| Freestyle Fighting Championships 5
| 
| align=center| 1
| align=center| 3:10
| Biloxi, Mississippi, United States
| 
|-
| Win
| align=center| 19–5
| Denis Kang
| Submission (triangle choke)
| UCC 11: The Next Level
| 
| align=center| 1
| align=center| 4:49
| Montreal, Quebec, Canada
| 
|-
| Win
| align=center| 18–5
| Travis Galbraith
| Submission (triangle choke)
| World Freestyle Fighting 2
| 
| align=center| 1
| align=center| N/A
| Kelowna, British Columbia, Canada
|Welterweight bout.
|-
| Loss
| align=center| 17–5
| David Loiseau
| Decision (unanimous)
| UCC 7: Bad Boyz
| 
| align=center| 3
| align=center| 5:00
| Montreal, Quebec, Canada
| 
|-
| Loss
| align=center| 17–4
| Egan Inoue
| Submission (toe hold)
| SuperBrawl 22
| 
| align=center| 1
| align=center| 0:56
| Honolulu, Hawaii, United States
| 
|-
| Loss
| align=center| 17–3
| Stephan Potvin
| Decision (unanimous)
| UCC 6: Redemption
| 
| align=center| 2
| align=center| 5:00
| Montreal, Quebec, Canada
| 
|-
| Win
| align=center| 17–2
| Robbie Newman
| Submission (armbar)
| Extreme Challenge 44
| 
| align=center| 1
| align=center| 1:45
| Lake Charles, Louisiana, United States
| 
|-
| Win
| align=center| 16–2
| Ray McDaniel
| TKO (submission to punches)
| Gladiators 16
| 
| align=center| 1
| align=center| N/A
| Des Moines, Iowa, United States
| 
|-
| Win
| align=center| 15–2
| Brett Al-azzawi
| Submission (keylock)
| UW: Ultimate Fight Minnesota
| 
| align=center| 1
| align=center| 2:58
| Bloomington, Minnesota, United States
| 
|-
| Win
| align=center| 14–2
| Scott Ventimiglia
| Submission (armbar)
| Rings USA: Battle of Champions
| 
| align=center| 1
| align=center| 2:33
| Council Bluffs, Iowa, United States
| 
|-
| Win
| align=center| 13–2
| John Alessio
| Submission (rear-naked choke)
| SuperBrawl: FutureBrawl 2000
| 
| align=center| 2
| align=center| 3:48
| Honolulu, Hawaii, United States
|Welterweight bout.
|-
| Win
| align=center| 12–2
| David Ferguson
| Submission (armbar)
| Dangerzone: Night of the Beast
| 
| align=center| 1
| align=center| N/A
| Lynchburg, Virginia, United States
| 
|-
| Win
| align=center| 11–2
| Mark Waters
| Submission (rear-naked choke)
| Extreme Challenge 36
| 
| align=center| 1
| align=center| 2:34
| Davenport, Iowa, United States
| 
|-
| Win
| align=center| 10–2
| Adrian Serrano
| Submission (keylock)
| Extreme Challenge 36
| 
| align=center| 1
| align=center| 2:17
| Davenport, Iowa, United States
| 
|-
| Win
| align=center| 9–2
| Mike Hueser
| Submission (armbar)
| Dangerzone: Battle At The Bear
| 
| align=center| 1
| align=center| 10:51
| New Town, North Dakota, United States
| 
|-
| Win
| align=center| 8–2
| Lee Murray
| Submission (kimura)
| Extreme Challenge 34
| 
| align=center| 1
| align=center| 1:19
| Hayward, Wisconsin, United States
| 
|-
| Win
| align=center| 7–2
| Mark Jaquith
| Submission (armbar)
| Extreme Challenge 34
| 
| align=center| 1
| align=center| 3:54
| Hayward, Wisconsin, United States
| 
|-
| Win
| align=center| 6–2
| John Renken
| Submission (keylock)
| Ultimate Fights
| 
| align=center| 1
| align=center| 2:24
| Winnipeg, Manitoba, Canada
|Return to Middleweight.
|-
| Loss
| align=center| 5–2
| Matt Hughes
| TKO (submission to knees and punches)
| Extreme Challenge 29
| 
| align=center| 2
| align=center| 0:25
| Hayward, Wisconsin, United States
|Welterweight debut.
|-
| Win
| align=center| 5–1
| Cris Custer
| Submission (armbar)
| WEF 7: Stomp in the Swamp
| 
| align=center| 1
| align=center| 3:17
| Kenner, Louisiana, United States
| 
|-
| Win
| align=center| 4–1
| Rick Graveson
| Submission (kimura)
| Extreme Challenge 27
| 
| align=center| 1
| align=center| 1:14
| Davenport, Iowa, United States
| 
|-
| Loss
| align=center| 3–1
| Eugene Jackson
| Submission (neck crank)
| Bas Rutten Invitational 1
| 
| align=center| 1
| align=center| N/A
| United States
| 
|-
| Win
| align=center| 3–0
| Dennis Reed
| Submission (triangle choke)
| Bas Rutten Invitational 1
| 
| align=center| 1
| align=center| N/A
| United States
| 
|-
| Win
| align=center| 2–0
| Ron Lobley
| Submission (rear-naked choke)
| Bas Rutten Invitational 1
| 
| align=center| 1
| align=center| N/A
| United States
| 
|-
| Win
| align=center| 1–0
| Abundio Munoz
| Submission (rear-naked choke)
| Bas Rutten Invitational 1
| 
| align=center| 1
| align=center| N/A
| United States
|

References

External links
 
 

1977 births
Canadian male mixed martial artists
Mixed martial artists utilizing Brazilian jiu-jitsu
Canadian practitioners of Brazilian jiu-jitsu
People awarded a black belt in Brazilian jiu-jitsu
Living people
Middleweight mixed martial artists
People from Eastman Region, Manitoba
Sportspeople from Manitoba
Canadian Mennonites
Ultimate Fighting Championship male fighters